The 2016–17 Western Kentucky Hilltoppers men's basketball team represented Western Kentucky University during the 2016–17 NCAA Division I men's basketball season. The Hilltoppers were led by head coach Rick Stansbury in his first season. They played their home games at E. A. Diddle Arena in Bowling Green, Kentucky and were third-year members of Conference USA. They finished the season 15–17, 9–9 in C-USA play to finish in a tie for seventh place. They lost to UTSA in the first round of the C-USA tournament.

Previous season
The Hilltoppers finished the 2015–16 season 18–16, 8–10 in C-USA play to finish in eighth place. They defeated North Texas and UAB to advance to the semifinals of the C-USA tournament where they lost to Old Dominion. Despite having 18 wins and a better they .500 record, they did not participate in a postseason tournament.

On March 17, 2016, head coach Ray Harper resigned after three players were suspended by a university disciplinary committee. He finished at WKU with a record of 90–62. On March 28, the school hired Rick Stansbury as head coach.

Offseason

Departures

Incoming transfers

Future recruits

Class of 2016 recruits

Class of 2017 recruits

Preseason 
The Hilltoppers were picked to finish in third place in the preseason Conference USA poll. Justin Johnson was selected to the preseason All-Conference USA team.

Roster

Schedule and results

|-
!colspan=9 style=| Exhibition

|-
!colspan=9 style=| Non-conference regular season

|-
!colspan=12 style=| Conference USA regular season

|-
!colspan=9 style=| Conference USA Tournament

Awards and honors 
Following the regular season, Justin Johnson was named to the All-Conference USA Second Team based on a poll of league coaches.

See also
2016–17 WKU Lady Toppers basketball team

References

Western Kentucky Hilltoppers basketball seasons
WKU
WKU
WKU